Sindhu was an Indian actress who appeared in South Indian films. She is the daughter of actress Manjula Vijaykumar's sister Shamala.

Partial filmography

Television
 1999 Micro thodar
 1999 Panchavarnakili
 2002-2003 Penn
 2002-2004 Annamalai as Thulasi
 2002-2003 Metti Oli as Sarala

Death
Sindhu picked up a lung infection during a door-to-door campaign for funds and died a few days later.

References

External links 
 

Place of birth missing
Actresses in Tamil cinema
Actresses in Kannada cinema
Indian film actresses
2005 deaths
1972 births
Actresses from Chennai
20th-century Indian actresses
21st-century Indian actresses
Deaths from pneumonia in India